Dan L. Johnston (April 6, 1938 – October 21, 2016) was an American lawyer and politician. He was from Des Moines, Iowa. A member of the Iowa Democratic Party, he served in the Iowa House of Representatives and as the Polk County attorney.

Early life
Born in Montezuma, Iowa, Johnston attended the public schools in Marshalltown and Toledo before earning a bachelor's degree from Westmar College, attending Iowa State University and earning a law degree from Drake University Law School.

Career
He served as an assistant Iowa attorney general before being elected to the Iowa House in 1966. Rather than seek re-election in 1968, he ran for Iowa Attorney General, winning the Democratic nomination before losing the general election to Republican Richard C. Turner. In 1975, he began working for the National Center for State Courts.

He was elected Polk County attorney in 1976, serving from 1977 to 1985, when he decided to resign and move to New York City. In New York, he served as director of Gay Men's Health Crisis from  1987 to 1990 and on the New York police civilian complaint review board from 1986 to 1990. He then lived in Washington, D.C. and worked as general counsel for the criminal justice subcommittee of the U.S. House Judiciary Committee.

Tinker v. Des Moines
Johnston's highest profile case as a lawyer was Tinker v. Des Moines, a case about the free speech rights of two Des Moines public school students who wore black armbands to protest the Vietnam War and were subsequently suspended by school administrators. Johnston argued and won the case in front of the U.S. Supreme Court in 1969, when he was just over a year out of law school.

Electoral history

Personal life
Johnston was gay; his partner for more than 35 years was Norman Jesse, who also served in the Iowa House. Neither Johnston nor Jesse was publicly out as gay during their careers in politics. They maintained separate residences across the street from each other and rarely spent the night together in the same bed.

Johnston's sexual orientation became an issue when he ran for re-election as Polk County attorney in 1980. Persistent rumors of his homosexuality culminated in a caller questioning Johnston on a local radio talk show. Johnston refused to answer, saying "that nobody had any business asking the question".

Johnston died of cancer on October 21, 2016 in a hospice in Des Moines, Iowa.

References

1938 births
2016 deaths
Democratic Party members of the Iowa House of Representatives
LGBT state legislators in Iowa
Gay politicians
Politicians from Des Moines, Iowa
People from Montezuma, Iowa
Iowa State University alumni
Westmar University alumni
District attorneys in Iowa
Deaths from cancer in Iowa
20th-century American lawyers
21st-century LGBT people
Drake University Law School alumni